Curtains is the seventh solo album by American musician John Frusciante, released on February 1, 2005 on Record Collection. The album is primarily an acoustic album, in contrast to his previous collaboration with Josh Klinghoffer, A Sphere in the Heart of Silence, which was mostly electronic. According to Frusciante, the album was recorded in his living room: "It was just me sitting on a pillow, on my living room floor, with my back leaning against the couch."

The album features contributions from Autolux drummer Carla Azar, upright bassist Ken Wild, and The Mars Volta guitarist Omar Rodríguez-López, with Frusciante noting, "Carla from the band Autolux plays drums. I loved having a feminine energy. My friend Omar Rodriguez-Lopez of the Mars Volta played some guitar. He and I do these solos together where we're using the same amp at the same time."

A video was released for "The Past Recedes".

The vinyl edition of the record saw a repressing from Record Collection on December 11, 2012.  These reissued records are 180 gram and come with a download of choice between MP3 and WAV formats of the album.

The album cover is reproduced from 17th-century painting "Aeneas and the Sibyl in the Underworld" by the Flemish painter Jan Brueghel the Younger.

Track listing

Personnel 
 John Frusciante – vocals, acoustic and electric guitar, electric bass, melodica, piano, string ensemble, mellotron, synthesizer, treatments, producer, design
 Omar Rodríguez-López – lead guitar on "Lever Pulled", joined lead guitar with Frusciante on "Anne"
 Carla Azar – drums
 Ken Wild – double bass

Production
 Didier Martín - production
 Ryan Hewitt – engineer, mixing
 Chris Holmes – additional mixing
 Bernie Grundman – mastering
 Lola Montes – photography
 Mike Piscitelli – design
 Dave Lee – equipment technician

References

John Frusciante albums
2005 albums